Pesočani is a village in the municipality of Debarca, North Macedonia. It used to be part of the former municipality of Belčišta.

History 
Pesočani during the Ottoman period was a village inhabited by Muslim Albanians until the onset of the Balkan Wars (1912-1913). In 1918 Pesočani was razed and Albanians fled to nearby villages such as Radolišta where the families of descendants are known by the village name of Pesoçan. Between 1912 and 1918 the village was destroyed and thereafter two new settlements were founded in its place: Novo Selo and Novo Aleksandrovo (both today became modern Pesočani). Pesočani was resettled with a Macedonian population.

Demographics
According to the 2002 census, the village had a total of 95 inhabitants. Ethnic groups in the village include:

Macedonians 95

References

External links

Villages in Debarca Municipality